Pieter D'Hont (24 April 1917 – 12 June 1997) was a Dutch sculptor.

He studied at the Rijksakademie in Amsterdam. D'Hont designed the statue of the Edison Award. Most of his works are located in Utrecht, Netherlands.

Gallery 

1917 births
1997 deaths
Dutch male sculptors
People from Hilversum
20th-century Dutch sculptors
20th-century Dutch male artists